The Early Language Milestone Scale (The ELM Scale) is one of the tools for detecting and measuring language delays in children. It is one of the first lines in the investigation process in diagnosing the delay, and also one of the tools for monitoring the progression. Because of the high sensitivity, it is used as a language-specific screener in the primary care setting in regard to development and growth. It provides a quick screening-evaluation approach and gives promise for meeting the criticisms directed at most of the other screeners.

Other tests such as Clinical Adaptive Test/Clinical Linguistic and Auditory Milestone Scale (CAT/CLAMS) or MCHAT (available in different languages) are also performed if the results of The ELM Scale become positive or equivocal.

See also
Modified Checklist for Autism in Toddlers

References

External links
 The Clinical Linguistic and Auditory Milestone Scale (CLAMS)

Child development
Screening and assessment tools in child and adolescent psychiatry